Two ships of the Royal Navy have been named HMS Hurworth

References

Royal Navy ship names